The 10th Golden Rooster Awards honoring the best in film of 1990, was given in Hongshan Gymnasium, Wuchang, Hubei Province, December 10, 1990.

Winners & nominees

References

External links 
 The 10th Golden Rooster Awards

1990
Golden
Gold